Tourism plays a significant part in the economic life of England. In 2018, the United Kingdom as a whole was the world's 10th most visited country for tourists, and 17 of the United Kingdom's 25 UNESCO World Heritage Sites fall within England.

VisitEngland is the official tourist board for England. VisitEngland's stated mission is to build England's tourism product, raise Britain's profile worldwide, increase the volume and value of tourism exports and develop England and Britain's visitor economy. In 2020, the Lonely Planet travel guide rated England as the second best country to visit that year, after Bhutan.

Lockdowns necessitated by the COVID-19 pandemic significantly reduced the number of visitors in 2020, and into 2021. , a 10-day quarantine period applies to people entering England from a number of "red list" countries.

Cities
The ten English cities visited most by overseas tourists in 2019 were:

 London — largest metropolitan area in Western Europe, and a global capital of finance, fashion, art and culture. In 2019, more than half of overseas tourists visiting the UK included a trip to London.
 Manchester — The third most visited city in the UK, a cultural, sporting, entertainment, shopping and media hub.
 Birmingham — the UK's second largest city (by population) in the industrial heartland.
 Liverpool — The home of the Beatles, a cosmopolitan city famous for its vibrant nightlife, rich cultural heritage, waterfront, architecture, and music and sport.
 Brighton and Hove — regency seaside resort and university town with quirky shopping, rich culture and vibrant gay nightlife.
 Bristol — vibrant music and art scene, historic buildings, a waterfront area in the West Country's largest city.
 Oxford and Cambridge — university towns with prestigious colleges, museums, and gardens.
 Bath  — UNESCO World Heritage Site city renowned for its Georgian architecture, gardens, parks, and museums.
 Leeds — cultural, financial and commercial heart of west Yorkshire

Tourist sites

Museums and galleries 

Unlike other countries, most state-run museums and places of cultural interest in England are free of charge to visit. Museums are an important aspect of English culture, and most cities and towns have a few museums and art galleries. Some of the most visited places are:

 British Museum
 Tate Modern
 National Gallery
 Natural History Museum, London
 Victoria & Albert Museum
 Science Museum, London
 Royal Museums Greenwich
 Tate Britain
 Ashmolean Museum
 National Railway Museum

World Heritage Sites 

17 of the 25 United Kingdom UNESCO World Heritage Sites fall within England. Some of the best known of these include Stonehenge, the Tower of London, the Jurassic Coast, Westminster, the Roman Baths in Bath, Saltaire, Ironbridge Gorge and Studley Royal Park.

The northernmost point of the Roman Empire, Hadrian's Wall, is the largest Roman artefact in the world, running a total of 73 miles in northern England.

Most visited sites

National Parks

Some notable National Parks in England include:
Lake District National Park — mountains, lakes and woodlands; the land of Wordsworth. 
New Forest National Park — one of the few remnants of the great oak and hornbeam woodland that once covered southern England.
North York Moors National Park — heather-clad hills, woodlands, sea cliffs and secluded beaches
Peak District National Park — rugged moors and hills which form the northern spine of England.
South Downs National Park — the gentle rolling chalk downs of southern England.

England possesses a wide range of natural environments, and continues to benefit from a significant ecotourism industry. Attractions include:

Eden Project in Cornwall.
The Lake District, a national park and mountainous region in Cumbria, including Windermere, the largest lake in England.
The Peak District, a national park and upland area lying mostly in Derbyshire.
Dartmoor and Exmoor, national parks and upland areas in Devon/Somerset.
The New Forest, a rural forest and national park lying mostly in Hampshire.
The Jurassic Coast, a World Heritage Site in Dorset and Devon.
The Broads, a national park and lowland area lying mostly in Norfolk.
The Yorkshire Dales, a national park and upland area in North Yorkshire and Cumbria.
The National Forest, covering parts of Leicestershire, Derbyshire and Staffordshire.
The South Downs, a national park stretching from Hampshire to East Sussex and comprising chalk uplands and sea cliffs.
Center Parcs, a European network of rural holiday parks.

Preservation trusts

A number of umbrella organisations are devoted to the preservation and public access of both natural and cultural heritage, including English Heritage and the National Trust. Membership with them, even on a temporary basis, gives priority free access to their properties thereafter.

English Heritage has a wide-ranging remit and manages more than 400 significant buildings and Monuments in England. They also maintain a register of thousands of listed buildings, those which are considered of most importance to the historic and cultural heritage of the country.

Travelling within England

The United Kingdom's bus services offers numerous, frequent and reliable transport around most of the larger towns and cities. Rural areas are less well served and hiring a car is often the best option to explore the countryside and villages.

The next most common methods of transports are taxis and trains. Great Britain's extensive rail network is used to travel between cities significantly more than aeroplanes, with a 2015 survey finding that only 1% of international visitors flew domestically after arrival.

Politics 
The Parliamentary Under Secretary of State for Arts, Heritage and Tourism is the minister with responsibility over tourism in the UK.

Effects of the COVID-19 pandemic 

The travel restrictions and lockdowns necessitated by the COVID-19 pandemic in 2020 led to a 76% reduction in "inbound tourism" to the UK that year.(Most reports that provide statistics on tourism cover the entire UK as an entity, although some do provide specifics for England.) The forecast for 2021 indicated an estimate that visits would be up "21% on 2020 but only 29% of the 2019 level". Some increase was expected but slowly at first and the report concluded that tourism was not expected to come "even close to normal levels".

The same VisitBritain report also discussed the effects of the pandemic on domestic within the UK in 2020, citing a significant reduction in spending, for an estimated  decline of 62% over the previous year. As of January 2021, the forecast for 2021 suggested that spending would increase by 79% over the previous year and that "the value of spending will be back to 84% of 2019 levels" by the end of 2021.

A report published in March 2021 by the Fraser of Allander Institute indicated that "tourism and hospitality suffered notable losses from the pandemic" and provided detailed specifics for both domestic and international visits. The government announced a £56m "welcome back fund" that month to help councils and businesses in coastal towns prepare to welcome tourists back safely in summer, "as soon as the roadmap allows".

On 5 April 2021, the BBC reported that the restrictions on domestic travel were expected to be loosened during that month, at least for travel within England, Scotland and Wales. (No announcement had been made as of early April by Northern Ireland.) The news item predicted that "hotels and B&Bs [were] set to open for holidaymakers in England on 17 May at the earliest". An article in The Guardian stated that "all shops in England will be allowed to reopen from next Monday [12 April], while pubs and restaurants will be allowed to serve customers outdoors. The VisitBritain website provided more specifics on 5 April as to "COVID-19 restrictions" that were expected to be loosened on 12 April but indicated that there was no confirmation as to whether the rules on international travel, either inbound or outbound, would actually be loosened in mid-May.

On 6 April 2021, CNN published an update as to the tourism situation in the UK for visits from other nations. Any visitors from "red list" countries were still not allowed to enter unless they were UK residents. "There's still not much to do in the UK right now ... although this lockdown is now being eased some restrictions will likely be in place until the summer", the report predicted, with June being the most likely time for tourism from other countries to begin a rebound.

On 5 April 2021, the VisitBritain website discussed a plan to relax some restrictions on visits to the UK from other nations by mid-May. The feasibility of the plan became less certain as of 8 April 2021 when sources in the European Union stated on that a "third wave of the pandemic [was sweeping] the continent"; the B117 variant was of particular concern. Two days earlier, PM Boris Johnson had made it clear that "We don't want to see the virus being reimported into this country from abroad".

Some restrictions on hospitality and domestic tourism were loosened in England on 12 April 2021; pubs and restaurants were allowed to open their outdoor facilities; non-essential stores opened; families were allowed to travel within England "in self-contained accommodation" and travel between Wales and England was fully permitted.

See also
 Lists of tourist attractions in England
Parliamentary Under Secretary of State for Arts, Heritage and Tourism
 Enjoy England
 Institute of Tourist Guiding
 Tourism in the United Kingdom

References

External links
  Text was copied from England at WikiTravel, which is released under a Creative Commons Attribution-Share Alike 3.0 (Unported) (CC-BY-SA 3.0) license.
 
 English Tourist Board
 England Wiki Travel guide 
 Best UK Places
 www.pagemost.com, Interactive Google maps showing local places and attractions, complete with Flickr photographs. Search by UK place name or postcode.